Iranian.com is a website of syndicated Iranian-related news.  The website has changed ownership over time, and promotes Palestinian rights advocacy and anti-regime change advocacy. 

When Javid, the original owner, started the website in 1995, he called it The Iranian (after The New Yorker).

On April 24, 2012, Javid announced to his sponsors at PBS that he was pursuing a new venture, and that he had sold his remaining shares to his partner, entrepreneur Saïd Amin.

Saïd Amin appears to be on the board of the National Iranian American Council.

See also
 Media of Iran
 List of Persian-language magazines

References

External links
 

American news websites
English-language websites
Ethnic mass media in the United States
Iranian-American culture in California
Internet properties established in 1995
News aggregators